Norapella parva is a moth of the Megalopygidae family. It was described by Schaus in 1896. It is found in Brazil.

The wingspan is 30 mm. Adults are entirely pure milky white.

References

Moths described in 1896
Megalopygidae